The George Fearn House is a historic residence in Mobile, Alabama, United States.  It was built in 1904 in the Spanish Colonial Revival style by local architect George Bigelow Rogers.  It was the first Spanish Colonial Revival building to be built in Mobile. The house was placed on the National Register of Historic Places on July 12, 1991.  It is a part of the Spanish Revival Residences in Mobile Multiple Property Submission.

References

National Register of Historic Places in Mobile, Alabama
Houses on the National Register of Historic Places in Alabama
Spanish Colonial Revival architecture in Alabama
Houses in Mobile, Alabama
Houses completed in 1904
George Bigelow Rogers buildings